The government of North Carolina is divided into three branches: executive, legislative, and judicial. These consist of the Council of State (led by the Governor), the bicameral legislature (called the General Assembly), and the state court system (headed by the North Carolina Supreme Court). The Constitution of North Carolina delineates the structure and function of the state government.

Executive branch

North Carolina's executive branch is governed by Article III of the state constitution.  The first North Carolina Constitution in 1776 called for a governor and a seven member Council of State elected by the legislature.  Currently, the ten-member Council of State of North Carolina includes the following members elected by voters:

Governor
Lieutenant Governor
Attorney General
Secretary of State
Commissioner of Agriculture
Commissioner of Insurance
Commissioner of Labor
Superintendent of Public Instruction
State Treasurer
State Auditor
 

The Council of State as a collective body is accorded little responsibility by the state constitution, though some statues grant it authority in certain cases, particularly in the acquisition of property by the state.

The nine North Carolina Cabinet departments, headed by department secretaries, plus the Department of Administration, are appointed by the Governor are as follows:

 Department of Administration,
 Department of Commerce,
 Department of Natural and Cultural Resources,
 Department of Environmental Quality,
 Department of Health and Human Services,
 Department of Information Technology
 Department of Revenue,
 Department of Public Safety,
 Department of Military and Veterans Affairs,
 Department of Transportation.
 

The North Carolina Register includes information about state agency rules, administrative rules, executive orders and other notices, and is published bimonthly. The North Carolina Administrative Code (NCAC) contains all the codified rules.

Legislative branch

The legislature derives its authority from Article II of the North Carolina Constitution.  The North Carolina General Assembly is the state legislature. Like all other states except for Nebraska, the legislature is bicameral, currently consisting of the 120-member North Carolina House of Representatives and the 50-member North Carolina Senate. The lieutenant governor is the ex officio president of the state Senate. The Senate also elects its own president pro tempore and the House elects its speaker.  Its session laws are published in the official North Carolina Session Laws and codified as the North Carolina General Statutes.

The first North Carolina General Assembly was convened on April 7, 1777 in New Bern, North Carolina. It consisted of a Senate, which had one member from each of 37 counties (regardless of population) and Washington District (became part of Tennessee in 1796), and a House of Commons, which had two members representing each county, plus one each from six districts or boroughs (Edenton, Halifax, Hillsborough, New Bern, Salisbury, and Wilmington).  Only land-owning (100 acres for the House of Commons,  for the Senate), Protestant men could serve.  The first legislature elected the Governor, Richard Caswell.   The legislature was more powerful compared to the executive branch in the early government.

Judiciary

North Carolina's current judicial system was created in the 1960s after significant consolidation and reform. The judicial system derives its authority from Article IV of the North Carolina Constitution.  The state court system is led by the Supreme Court of North Carolina, the state supreme court, which consists of seven justices. The North Carolina Court of Appeals is the state's intermediate appellate court and consists of fifteen judges who rule in rotating panels of three. Together, the Supreme Court and Court of Appeals constitute the appellate division of the court system.

The trial division includes the Superior Court and the District Court. The Superior Court is the state trial court of general jurisdiction; all felony criminal cases, civil cases involving an amount in controversy in excess of $25,000, and appeals from the District Court are tried (de novo review) in Superior Court. A jury of 12 hears the criminal cases.

The District Court is a court of limited jurisdiction. It has original jurisdiction over family law matters (divorce, child custody, child support); civil claims involving less than $25,000; criminal cases involving misdemeanors and lesser infractions; and juvenile cases involving children under the age of 16 who are delinquent and children under the age of 18 who are undisciplined, dependent, neglected, or abused. Magistrates of the District Court may accept guilty pleas for minor misdemeanors, accept guilty pleas for traffic violations, and accept waivers of trial for worthless check and other charges. In civil cases, the magistrate is authorized to try small claims involving up to $10,000 including landlord-tenant and eviction cases. Magistrates also perform civil marriages. District Court only conducts bench trials, with no jury.

Local government

Local governments in North Carolina primarily consist of counties, cities, and towns. The state makes no legal distinction between a town and a city. There are also special purpose governments, most of which concern either soil and water conservation or housing and community development. Some local governments are joined in regional councils with others to improve coordination and cooperation. 

North Carolina has 100 counties and more than 500 municipalities. North Carolina is a Dillon's rule state, and municipalities are only able to exercise the authority that the General Assembly explicitly gives them since

Unlike most other states, North Carolina does not grant broad authority over local matters to local governments through its state constitution or a single state statute. Instead, North Carolina local governments derive their authority from a “patchwork of local and general laws.” These laws include “numerous general statutes” laying out the general powers of all local governments and local acts that apply only to a given municipality or set of municipalities. In some cases, the charter establishing a particular local government provides that government with additional authority.

The General Assembly's authority to create local governments comes from Article VII of the Constitution of North Carolina.

County governments in North Carolina include the following officials:
 
Sheriffs
County commissioners
District attorneys
Justices of the Peace (historical)
North Carolina register of deeds
North Carolina clerk of court (historical)
Alcoholic Beverage Control Board
Board of Education
Board of Elections
Public Health Board
Mental Health Board
Social Services Board

Most municipalities in North Carolina operate under council-manager governments. Some of these municipalities have mayors, who preside over the elected city council, which determines local government policy and creates the city budget. Most mayors are popularly elected and do not typically vote in council meetings. The council hires the city manager and, depending on the municipality, may directly hire a few other officials, such as the city attorney. In cities with a manager, the manager acts as the head executive officer of the city and is responsible for municipal employees and implementing policy. Smaller municipalities are more likely to not employ a manager. 

All counties in the state are led by an elected board of commissioners who employ a county manager. Boards of commissioners vary in size from three to 11 members. In addition to the manager, the commissioners usually hire the county's clerk, attorney, assessor, and tax collector. Unlike in municipal council-manager governments in the state, the board of commissioners usually must approve all of the manager's hiring decisions unless they explicitly delegate sole hiring authority to the manager. County government is North Carolina is also more fractured than municipal government, due to the presence of other elected officials such as sheriffs and registers of deeds, who have control over their own staff. The office of county sheriff is established by the constitution, and sheriffs are not subject to the oversight of the state government. County government is largely funded through local property taxes.

Current Council of State officials
The 2019 elected ten-member Council of State of North Carolina is composed of:

See also
 Politics of North Carolina
 List of governors of North Carolina
 Law of North Carolina

References

Works cited

External links
 

 
North Carolina